Ascanio Maffei (died 1659) was a Roman Catholic prelate who served as Archbishop of Urbino (1646–1659).

Biography
Ascanio Maffei was born in Rome, Italy.
On 25 Jun 1646, he was appointed during the papacy of Pope Innocent X as Archbishop of Urbino.
On 1 Jul 1646, he was consecrated bishop by Marcello Lante della Rovere, Cardinal-Bishop of Ostia e Velletri, with Ranuccio Scotti Douglas, Bishop Emeritus of Borgo San Donnino, and Giacomo Accarisi, Bishop of Vieste, serving as co-consecrators. 
He served as Archbishop of Urbino until his death in Oct 1659.

While bishop, he was the principal co-consecrator of Flavio Galletti, Bishop of Anglona-Tursi (1646) .

References

External links and additional sources
 (for Chronology of Bishops) 
 (for Chronology of Bishops)  

17th-century Italian Roman Catholic bishops
Bishops appointed by Pope Innocent X
1659 deaths